Frank A. Blethen (born April 20, 1945) is an American executive who is the publisher of The Seattle Times and chief executive officer (CEO) of The Seattle Times Company, based in Seattle, Washington, United States. He is a fourth-generation member of the Blethen family, which has owned the newspaper since 1896, and took over as publisher in 1985. He also served as publisher of the Walla Walla Union-Bulletin, a newspaper owned by the company, in the 1970s. During his tenure as publisher, the family's control of the newspaper declined, along with the profitability of the newspaper industry in general. The newspaper entered into a joint operating agreement with its rival Seattle Post-Intelligencer that lasted  until that newspaper ceased printing in 2009.

Early life and education

Francis Alden Blethen Jr. was born in Seattle on April 20, 1945, the second of two children to Francis Alden Blethen and his third wife, Kathleen Mary Ryan. He is a fourth-generation member of the Blethen family and the great-grandson of Times founder Alden J. Blethen. His parents divorced in 1951, and Frank was taken to live in Scottsdale, Arizona, with his mother and elder sister Diane. Frank was the only member of the Blethen family to have been raised outside of Seattle. He returned to Seattle in the summers and spent time with his aunts, uncles, and cousins, but rarely saw his father. As a teenager, Blethen worked in the advertising department as a copy boy, but had no intention of working in the newspaper business. Blethen attended Arizona State University, majoring in business studies, and later completed his master's degree at Harvard Business School in 1978.

Blethen calls himself the "accidental publisher" because he had no intention of running the business until the 1980s. He has a tattoo of the Seattle eagle on the calf of his leg.

Career

Blethen returned to Seattle after the death of his estranged father in 1967, having completed his senior year at Arizona State University. Blethen began his career at The Times as the assistant credit manager. When his boss took a leave of absence, Blethen advanced to credit manager. Blethen took a variety of jobs at the Seattle Times, such as building manager, where he would negotiate janitorial and security contracts or oversee the remodeling of the cafeteria, as well as other positions, before eventually leading the company. Blethen also spent four years working at the newspaper Walla Walla Union-Bulletin in Walla Walla, Washington, which was where he realized his passion was in journalism. Blethen and his family are also the owners of the Yakima Herald-Republic, Walla Walla Union-Bulletin, and several other Seattle-area weeklies, including the Issaquah Press. He has been the publisher of the Times for over 30 years.

Context
Blethen has worked in the journalism world for almost 50 years and has seen the industry change. He has emphasized the character of family-owned business that has made the Seattle Times different from other large corporate news companies. While the company is controlled by the Blethens, Frank Blethen's grandfather sold part interest in the company to the Ridder Bros., known today as Knight Ridder.

Blethen joined the family business full-time in 1968, holding a variety of training positions until about 1974 when he decided to join the Seattle Times-owned Walla Walla Union-Bullentin as the publisher. Blethen then returned to the Seattle Times Company in 1980 and held various executive positions in advertising, circulation, marketing and labor.

When he started his career as publisher at the Times in 1985, when the entire cooperation revolved around printing. For years the Seattle Times and Seattle Post-Intelligencer competed and operated under a joint operating agreement. The P-I ceased print publication in 2009 but still competes for the internet traffic and advertising. With the print world shrinking over the last 30 years, Blethen said that about 40 percent of the Times digital readers today reach the company through social media channels or by searching for them on the internet.

Impact
Frank Blethen argues that free, high quality public education to be a prerequisite for a successful democracy. Blethen has donated significant amounts to educational institutions  and helped create the two-year Greater Good Campaign, a movement against the state's legislature's defunding of higher public education, but has been criticized for campaigning against taxes that would fund public education. 
In the publishing world he has won awards for significant longterm contributions to diversity. He has also been criticized for mixing business interests with content issues, which is traditionally separated at newspapers.

Awards
 Edward R.Murrow Award for Lifetime Achievements in Journalism from WSU's School of Communications (1998). 
 Asian American Journalist Associations' Special Recognition Award (2011)
 Northwest Journalist of Color Diversity Award (2011)
 AAJA Leadership in Diversity Award (2014) and in 2018 the Seattle Times newsroom won the same award.

References 

1945 births
Living people
American newspaper publishers (people)
Businesspeople from Seattle
The Seattle Times Company
Arizona State University alumni
Harvard Business School alumni